The Salt Lake Regional Medical Center is a 158-bed hospital in Salt Lake City, Utah.

Salt Lake Regional Medical Center was formerly known as Holy Cross Hospital, which was one of the few Catholic hospitals in Utah for over a century. The hospital was sold by the Sisters of the Holy Cross in 1994 to the for-profit, HealthTrust and renamed. Due to antitrust concerns raised by the Federal Trade Commission, the hospital was sold to Champion Healthcare Corporation in 1995. The facility changed hands again in 1998 when Champion merged with Paracelsus Healthcare Corporation. It was operated by Iasis Healthcare from 2001 until September 2017, when Iasis Healthcare was acquired by Steward Health Care.

References

Hospitals in Salt Lake City
1994 establishments in Utah
Hospitals established in 1994